Rosario – Islas Malvinas International Airport , formerly known as Fisherton International Airport, is located  west-northwest from the center of Rosario, a city in the Santa Fe Province of Argentina.

The airport serves the Greater Rosario area and is served by Aerolíneas Argentinas and COPA. There are domestic flights within Argentina from Rosario to Buenos Aires, Córdoba, Salta, Puerto Iguazú, San Carlos de Bariloche, El Calafate, Mar del Plata (via Buenos Aires), Mendoza (vía Córdoba), Santa Fe (via Buenos Aires) and Villa Gesell (only in summer, via Buenos Aires), as well as international services to Panama.

A new terminal was constructed between 2003 and 2004, effectively making Rosario an international airport.

During the first years of the 21st century the Rosario Airport lost a considerable volume of air traffic, even after being updated and expanded in 2003–2004. In 2005 there were only 1,807 flights, about 75% less than in 2000. Since 2013, however, it has been steadily growing in both traffic and connectivity.

The airport's name reflects Argentina's claims of sovereignty over the Falkland Islands (Islas Malvinas in Spanish).

Airlines and destinations

See also

Transport in Argentina
List of airports in Argentina

References

External links 
El Aeropuerto Internacional de Rosario  at City of Rosario website
Aeropuerto Internacional Rosario "Islas Malvinas"  at Organismo Regulador del Sistema Nacional de Aeropuertos

Airports in Argentina
Transport in Rosario, Santa Fe